Michael Morrison (February 6, 1867 – June 16, 1955) was a right-handed professional baseball pitcher who played from 1887 to 1888 and in 1890 for the Cleveland Spiders, Syracuse Stars and Baltimore Orioles.

Not much is known about Morrison's career prior to the major leagues. He played for a team known as the Erie Jarecki Manufacturing nine in 1884 and in 1885, he played with a team known as the Erie Olympics.

Morrison was purchased from the New York Metropolitans for $500 in January, 1887, and he played in his first big league game on April 19, 1887. That season he went 12-25 with a 4.92 ERA in 316 innings. In 40 games started, he had 35 complete games, 205 walks and 158 strikeouts. He led the league in home runs allowed (13) and walks allowed, he finished second in strikeouts per nine innings (4.49), fourth in hit batsmen (22), sixth in strikeouts and losses, and eighth in earned runs allowed. His 22 hit batsmen are tied for ninth most all time among rookie pitchers.

He appeared in only four games in 1888, going 1-3 with a 5.40 ERA.

In 1890, Morrison split time with two teams, the Stars and Orioles. He went 7-11 with a 5.53 ERA that season, making 21 appearances (18 starts) and completing 16 games. His 21 wild pitches were seventh in the league and his three games finished were ninth. His 4.82 strikeouts per nine innings were also ninth in the league.

He played his final big league game on September 21, 1890.

Overall, Morrison went 20-39 with a 5.14 ERA in 65 career games (62 starts). He had 55 complete games, 325 walks and 254 strikeouts in 504 innings. As a hitter, he hit .213 in 287 career at-bats.

Following his death, Morrison was buried in Trinity Cemetery in Erie.

References

External links

1867 births
1955 deaths
Major League Baseball pitchers
Baseball players from Pennsylvania
Cleveland Spiders players
Syracuse Stars (AA) players
Baltimore Orioles (AA) players
Sportspeople from Erie, Pennsylvania
Hamilton Clippers players
Hamilton Primrose players
Lima Lushers players
Milwaukee Brewers (minor league) players
Milwaukee Creams players
Minneapolis Millers (baseball) players
Detroit Wolverines (minor league) players
Evansville Hoosiers players
New Haven Nutmegs players
Syracuse Stars (minor league baseball) players
Marinette Badgers players
Ishpeming-Nagaunee Unions players
Saginaw Alerts players
Canton Deubers players
Terre Haute Hottentots players
19th-century baseball players